The Register is a British technology news website co-founded in 1994 by Mike Magee, John Lettice and Ross Alderson. The online newspaper's masthead sublogo is "Biting the hand that feeds IT." Their primary focus is information technology news and opinions.

Situation Publishing Ltd is listed as the site's publisher. Drew Cullen is an owner and Linus Birtles is the managing director. Andrew Orlowski was the executive editor before leaving the website in May 2019.

History
The Register was founded in London as an email newsletter called Chip Connection. In 1998 The Register became a daily online news source. Magee left in 2001 to start competing publications The Inquirer, and later the IT Examiner and TechEye.

In 2002, The Register expanded to have a presence in London and San Francisco, creating The Register USA at theregus.com through a joint venture with Tom's Hardware. In 2003, that site moved to theregister.com. That content was later merged onto theregister.co.uk. The Register carries syndicated content including Simon Travaglia's BOFH stories.

In 2010 The Register supported the successful launch of the Paper Aircraft Released into Space, a project they announced in 2009 that released a paper plane in the extreme upper atmosphere.

The Register also ran the websites Register Hardware and Channel Register, which merged into The Register.

Readership and content
In 2011 it was read daily by over 350,000 users according to the Audit Bureau of Circulations, rising to 468,000 daily and nearly 9.5 million monthly in 2013. In November 2011 the UK and US each accounted for approximately 42% and 34% of page impressions respectively, with Canada being the next most significant origin of page hits at 3%. In 2012 the UK and US accounted for approximately 41% and 28% of page impressions respectively, with Canada at 3.61%.

Channel Register covers computer business and trade news, which includes business press releases. News and articles for computer hardware and consumer electronics are covered by Reg Hardware. Reg Research is an in-depth resource on technologies and how they relate to business.

Their stories are cited by major news sources and also used for backup information. Stories in other periodicals were based on their exposés. InformationWeek ran a story about TheRegister'''s story about a New York Times article.

In September 2018, the Alexa ranking was #7,194.

WritersThe Register has an editorial staff of 16 writers and production experts. Chris Williams is editor-in-chief. Paul Kunert is UK editor, Iain Thomson is US news editor and Simon Sharwood is Asia-Pacific editor. Columnists include Mark Pesce and Rupert Goodwins.

Intel chips flaw investigation

On 6 February 2017, The Register was the first news outlet to accurately trace a recently discovered flaw in Cisco (and other makers) gear to a serious defect on Intel's Atom C2000 series processors.

Around 3 January 2018, The Register broke news about Google's long-ongoing investigation into Intel's processor design, which revealed that a serious flaw in the design of their chips would require Microsoft, Linux and Apple to update operating systems for computers around the world.

CriticismThe Register has published both headlines and stories that have generated controversy. The Guardian accused The Register of misunderstanding climate science and misrepresenting a paper in the journal Nature'' in a manner that deliberately minimised the climate impact of human emissions.

References

External links
 
 

1994 establishments in the United Kingdom
British technology news websites
Computer magazines published in the United Kingdom
Computer science in the United Kingdom
Internet properties established in 1994
Magazines established in 1994
Magazines published in London
Online magazines published in the United Kingdom
Science and technology magazines published in the United Kingdom